Gomiécourt is a commune in the Pas-de-Calais department in the Hauts-de-France region of France.

Geography

Population

Places of interest
 The church of St. Pierre – rebuilt, as was most of the village, after World War I
 The Commonwealth War Graves Commission cemetery

See also
 Communes of the Pas-de-Calais department

References

External links

 The CWGC cemetery

Communes of Pas-de-Calais